The 1958 British Empire and Commonwealth Games (Welsh: Gemau Ymerodraeth Prydain a'r Gymanwlad 1958) were held in Cardiff, Wales, from 18–26 July 1958.

Thirty-five nations sent a total of 1,130 athletes and 228 officials to the Cardiff Games and 23 countries and dependencies won medals, including, for the first time, Singapore, Ghana, Kenya and the Isle of Man.

The Cardiff Games introduced the Queen's Baton Relay, which has been conducted as a prelude to every British Empire and Commonwealth Games ever since.

Venues

The British Empire and Commonwealth Games, including the opening and closing ceremonies, were held at the Cardiff Arms Park in the centre Cardiff. A new Wales Empire Pool was constructed for the event. The Sophia Gardens Pavilion was used for the boxing and wrestling events, and Maindy Stadium was used for track cycling. 178,000 tickets were eventually sold during the Games.   Rowing took place on Llyn Padarn in Llanberis.

Participating teams

36 countries and territories were represented (and 1,100 athletes), being the largest number to date, with a significant number of teams competing for the first time at the 1958 British Empire and Commonwealth Games.

At Cardiff Arms Park, an anti-apartheid crowd protested at the all-white South African team; games organisers responded that non-white South Africans were ineligible as their associations were not affiliated to the international federations. South Africa left the Commonwealth in 1961 and next appeared at the Games in 1994.

(Teams competing for the first time are shown in bold).

Medals by country

Medals by event

Athletics

Bowls

Boxing
Boxing Events were at Sophia Gardens Pavilion, Cardiff.

Cycling

Track
The track cycling events were held at the Maindy Stadium in Cardiff.

Road

Fencing

Rowing
The rowing events were held on Llyn Padarn in Llanberis.

Swimming
Swimming events were held at the Wales Empire Pool in Cardiff.

Men's events

Women's events

Diving
Diving events were held at the Wales Empire Pool in Cardiff.

Weightlifting

Wrestling

References

External links
 "Cardiff 1958". Thecgf.com. Commonwealth Games Federation.
 "Results and Medalists—1958 British Empire and Commonwealth Games". Thecgf.com. Commonwealth Games Federation.
Pathe news: Commonwealth Games Cardiff 1958 reel 1
Pathe news: Commonwealth Games Cardiff 1958 reel 2

 
International sports competitions hosted by Wales
Sports competitions in Cardiff
British Empire And Commonwealth Games
Empire And Commonwealth Games
Commonwealth Games in the United Kingdom
British Empire and Commonwealth Games
Commonwealth Games by year
British Empire and Commonwealth Games, 1958
British Empire and Commonwealth Games